Alfred T. Fellheimer (March 9, 1875 – 1959) was an American architect. He began his career with Reed & Stem, where he was lead architect for Grand Central Terminal. Beginning in 1928, his firm Fellheimer & Wagner designed Cincinnati Union Terminal.

Biography
Felheimer was born in Chicago. He graduated in 1895 from the University of Illinois School of Architecture where he had studied with Nathan Clifford Ricker.

In 1898, he joined the firm of Frost & Granger. In 1903 he joined Reed and Stem. As a junior partner he was lead architect in Reed & Stem's partnership with Warren and Wetmore to design Grand Central Terminal during its construction, starting in 1903.  Following the death of Charles Reed in 1911 he became a named partner of Stem & Fellheimer which designed Union Station (Utica, New York) in 1913. The firm became Fellheimer & Long with Allen H. Stem Associated Architects in 1914 and designed the Morris Park (IRT Dyre Avenue Line) in the Bronx.

In 1923 he and an associate, Steward Wagner, from the earlier firm formed Fellheimer & Wagner and designed the Union Station in Erie, Pennsylvania. The firm completed the Cincinnati station in 1933. In 1939 the firm had a commission to do a complete overhaul of the CBS Studio Building.

The firm became Fellheimer, Wagner & Vollmer which designed the Farragut Houses project in Brooklyn starting in 1942. and the Albany Houses complex in Brooklyn starting in 1950 for the New York City Housing Authority.

In 1951, the firm designed a new Montclair, New Jersey branch store with Roland Wank for Newark-based Hahne & Company.  In 1952, Fellheimer & Wagner designed the Beekman Theatre in New York City.

The architectural drawings of Fellheimer & Wagner are held by the Department of Drawings & Archives at the Avery Architectural and Fine Arts Library, Columbia University.

Projects
Grand Central Terminal, Manhattan, New York, 1913
Quaker Ridge (NYW&B station), New Rochelle, New York, 1912
Union Station, Utica, New York, 1913
Morris Park (NYW&B station), Bronx, New York 1914
Terminal Station (Macon, Georgia), 1916
Union Station (Burlington, Vermont), 1916
Union Station, Erie Pennsylvania, 1927
Greensboro (Amtrak station), Greensboro, North Carolina, 1927
Buffalo Central Terminal, Buffalo, New York, 1929
Union Station (South Bend, Indiana), 1929
Hamilton GO Centre (TH&B Head Office and Hamilton Station), Hamilton, Ontario (1931-1933)
Cincinnati Union Terminal, Cincinnati, Ohio, 1933
CBS Studio Building, Manhattan, New York, 1939 (remodel)
Farragut Houses, Brooklyn, New York, 1942
Albany Houses, Brooklyn, New York, 1950
Hahne & Company department store, Montclair, New Jersey, 1951
Beekman Theatre, Manhattan, 1952

See also
Avery Architectural and Fine Arts Library

Gallery

References

External links
 Fellheimer & Wagner architectural drawings of railroad stations in the United States and Canada, 1915-1931.Held by the Department of Drawings & Archives, Avery Architectural & Fine Arts Library, Columbia University.

1875 births
1959 deaths
Architects from Chicago
University of Illinois School of Architecture alumni
American railway architects
20th-century American architects